Hey Girl is an American weekly half-hour sketch comedy television series that aired on MTV. It was developed by Daniel Powell and Jessi Klein, and stars JC Coccolli, Daniella Pineda, Esther Povitsky, Ali Wong, Emily Axford, Laura Willcox, Shelby Fero, Sasheer Zamata, and Wendy McColm. It aired on Sundays at 9pm, first in a "sneak peek" airing of four episodes on July 28, 2013, and then with an official premiere on October 27, 2013, with new episodes at 9pm and 9:30pm. The show was pulled from the broadcast schedule after the second week, having aired eight episodes. Four additional episodes were gradually released at MTV.com in February and March 2014.

References

External links
 

2010s American sketch comedy television series
2013 American television series debuts
English-language television shows
MTV original programming